The year 1985 was the 204th year of the Rattanakosin Kingdom of Thailand. It was the 40th year in the reign of King Bhumibol Adulyadej (Rama IX), and is reckoned as year 2528 in the Buddhist Era.

Incumbents
King: Bhumibol Adulyadej 
Crown Prince: Vajiralongkorn
Prime Minister: Prem Tinsulanonda
Supreme Patriarch: Ariyavangsagatayana VII

Events

January

February

March

April

May

June

July

August

September

October

November

December

Births

Deaths

See also
 1985 in Thai television
 List of Thai films of 1985

References

External links

 
Years of the 20th century in Thailand
Thailand
Thailand
1980s in Thailand